Matsumura is a Japanese surname. Notable people with the surname include:

, Japanese handball player
, Japanese synchronized swimmer
, Japanese curler
, Japanese painter
, Japanese botanist
, Japanese volleyball player
, Japanese film director and screenwriter
, Japanese comedian
, Japanese golfer
, Japanese figure skater and coach
, Japanese cross-country skier
, Japanese karateka
, Japanese footballer
, Japanese politician
, Japanese singer and actress
, Japanese entomologist
, Japanese karateka
, Japanese swimmer
, Japanese composer and poet
, Japanese politician
, Japanese volleyball player

See also
9105 Matsumura, a main-belt asteroid

Japanese-language surnames